Planet Coaster is a construction and management simulation video game developed and published by Frontier Developments for Windows. It was released worldwide on 17 November 2016. Frontier had previously worked in the amusement park construction and management genre with RollerCoaster Tycoon 3 (to which Planet Coaster is a spiritual successor), Thrillville, Thrillville: Off the Rails, and Zoo Tycoon. A version for PlayStation 4, Xbox One, and Xbox Series X/S, known as Planet Coaster: Console Edition, was released worldwide on 10 November 2020. The PlayStation 5 version was released in North America and Australia on 12 November 2020 and in Europe on 19 November 2020. A macOS version, developed by Aspyr, was later released on 17 November 2020 on both Steam and Mac App Store.

There are four different modes in the game, namely Sandbox, Challenge, Career, and Scenario Editor. In the career mode, players assume the role of a theme park manager and must complete tasks such as constructing unfinished roller coasters or hiring janitors. In Sandbox mode, players are tasked to construct their own theme park on an empty plot of land. The challenge mode is similar to the sandbox mode, but with added difficulty, as players need to take funds into account. The Scenario Mode, which was added in the 1.4.0 update on 22 November 2017, is similar to career mode, but allow player customise their own task in all saved parks.

Originally called Coaster Park Tycoon, the game was revealed on 29 January 2015 and was renamed during E3 2015. Planet Coaster is Frontier's second self-published franchise, following Elite Dangerous. Frontier organised multiple alpha and beta tests before launching the game in November 2016. The game was supported with free as well as paid post-release downloadable content upon launch. The title received positive reviews upon release, with critics praising the game's sandbox mode and creation tools. Criticism was mainly directed to the game's career mode. It was a commercial success, with more than 2.5 million copies sold as of January 2020.

Gameplay 

Planet Coaster is a construction and management simulation video game. Similar to its spiritual predecessor, the game allows players to build different theme park rides and roller-coasters. These player-created attractions can be shared through a mechanic called "global village". The game also comes with ten mascots.

Before starting the game on the computer version, the player must create their own avatar. This game function though, is not used or even done in the Console versions. Afterward, the player is able to choose between four game modes: sandbox, challenge, career, and scenario editor.

Similar to Frontier's previous game, RollerCoaster Tycoon 3, the Sandbox Mode enables players to construct their own theme park on an empty plot of land. In Sandbox Mode, all features and rides of the game are unlocked and the player's funds are unlimited. This is the mode most players use to create items (parks, coasters, scenery, etc.) and then post them to Steam's Planet Coaster Workshop (not available for Mac App Store version), or the Frontier Workshop on the console versions.

In the Challenge Mode, the player must construct an amusement park on an empty lot (similar to Sandbox Mode) but with limited funds and research depending on chosen difficulty—Easy, Medium, or Hard. As the player develops their park, the game presents the player with challenges that the player must accept or decline. Upon completion of a challenge, the player is given a reward such as a park rating boost or a sum of money.

In the Career Mode, the player must complete objectives such as constructing roller coasters, achieving park ratings or hiring janitors. Similar to RollerCoaster Tycoon 3, Career Mode allows players to progress by completing scenarios with objectives in different difficulties.

First unveiled at EGX 2016, the game also features a dedicated mode called the "crash mode" which allows players to construct incomplete coasters and let them crash into the park's visitors.

On 26 April 2017, Frontier revealed the existence of several cheat codes that were previously undiscovered on their official forums. These included the ability to drive go-karts and the ability for security guards to plough through guests similar to a bulldozer.

On 22 November 2017, the Scenario Editor mode was added in 1.4.0 update, which same to Career Mode, but allow player customize their own objectives in all saved parks, then post them to Steam's Planet Coaster Workshop.

The console edition has various differences from the PC/Mac version, such as a tutorial, a revamped career mode with voice acting, and a counter that tells the player how much they can place in their park.

Development 

Before the development of Planet Coaster, Frontier Developments had developed several other construction and management simulation video games, including 2004's commercial and critical success RollerCoaster Tycoon 3, which sold over 10 million copies. Planet Coaster serves only as a spiritual successor to RollerCoaster Tycoon 3 instead of a direct sequel, as the company considered the use of the brand Tycoon "didn't carry the cachet anymore" due to the releases of mainly poorly-received Tycoon games in recent years. In a December 2016 interview with Cambridge News, David Walsh (the Chief Operating Officer of Frontier Developments) said that the success of Elite Dangerous
enabled the company "to bring Planet Coaster to the market, which is highly significant as it demonstrates we are not a single game company”. Frontier Developments spent £6 million on the game's development and an additional £1.5 million on marketing.

The game was announced on 29 January 2015 by Frontier Developments. Originally called Coaster Park Tycoon, the game was renamed into Planet Coaster on 16 June 2015 during the PC Gaming Show at E3 2015. Frontier Developments aimed to turn the game into the company's second self-published franchise, along with the Elite series. The game uses an advanced version of Cobra Engine, which is an in-house proprietary engine developed by Frontier previously used by games like Elite Dangerous and RollerCoaster Tycoon 3. Features confirmed for the game include a hybrid spline/piece-by-piece coaster builder, modular structure building, a voxel terrain editor among others detailed through Q&A's and "Dev Diaries." On the second live stream, the release date of the alpha was announced. Released on 22 March 2016, the alpha emphasized on modular building and paths. The alpha contained two themes: "Planet Coaster" and "Pirate". Although disabled by default, Coaster Building was included in the first alpha through a cheat code.

On 24 May 2016, Frontier released the second alpha build. This build included finances, terrain tools, improved path building, and the official release of a coaster builder. Also, on 25 August, Frontier discontinued further alpha purchases. On 24 September, Frontier announced at EGX 2016 that players who had pre-ordered the "Thrillseeker Edition" would be able to test the game that October. At Gamescom 2016, Frontier announced that the game would be released on 17 November 2016. The game was released with Denuvo's anti-tamper technology.

To record the audio for the game, sound designer Watson Wu took over the Holiday World & Splashin' Safari theme park in Santa Claus, Indiana, to record the sounds of various attractions. Guests in the park and park staff speak their own fictional language, known as "Planco". According to James Stant, Frontier's senior audio designer, the language contains about 7,000 words. After the game's release, Frontier Developments released an official Planco dictionary.

Soundtrack 
Planet Coaster features an adaptive soundtrack composed by Jim Guthrie and JJ Ipsen, released under the album titled You, Me & Gravity: The Music of Planet Coaster. Additionally, players may upload their own sound files to use in their parks.

Downloadable content 
On 21 July 2017, Frontier launched paid downloadable content for the game featuring props inspired by Back to the Future, Knight Rider, and The Munsters.

In August 2017, Frontier partnered with Cedar Point to provide an in-game version of the park's upcoming Steel Vengeance roller coaster before the ride officially opened in 2018.

On 21 September 2018, Frontier announced the "Thememaker's Toolkit". This toolkit will enable players to import custom 3D models into Planet Coaster itself. This was released on 20 November.

The console version adds in an exclusive coaster for those who pre-ordered the game.

Reception

The game was met with praise upon release of the alpha. Andy Kelly of PC Gamer commented that Frontier was "off to a tremendous start", adding that creating buildings with the creation tools hinted at "immense possibilities". However, Mark Walton of Ars Technica noted several small flaws including the "hard to navigate" menus and the lack of custom built roller coasters. On 27 April 2016, about a month after the release of the alpha, Frontier announced that Planet Coaster had grossed nearly two million dollars.

Matt Wales of Eurogamer recommended the game, concluding that the game is "the finest simulator yet". Meanwhile, Ben Reeves of Game Informer praised the game for its creative mode but criticized the game's career mode, referring to it as "boring" and "tedious". TJ Hafer of IGN compared the game's integration of Steam Workshop to Minecraft and Second Life. Edmond Tran of GameSpot praised the game for its accessible creative tools and for its evocative tone. Jonathan Leack of Game Revolution claimed that the game "resurrected the [theme park simulation] genre". In a critical review of the game, Jody Macgregor of PC Gamer praised the game's challenge mode but criticized the game for not innovating enough from RollerCoaster Tycoon 3. The original score (70/100) was retracted due to miscommunication between Frontier Developments and PC Gamer with the game version they received; its reevaluated score is 75/100. Patrick Hancock of Destructoid noted that the game suffers frame rate issues in larger parks. Furthermore, Edge noted that the game's "fiddly" camera makes some actions harder.

In 2020, Rock, Paper, Shotgun rated Planet Coaster in their top 10 management games for the PC.

Many fans made favourable comparisons to RollerCoaster Tycoon World, which received largely negative reviews.

Sales
Upon release, the game topped the Steam "top sellers" charts. The game sold over 400,000 copies in the first month of its release. Despite being released in the later part of the year, Planet Coaster was featured on Steam's "Top 100 Best Sellers of 2016" chart as a "silver tier" game. In August 2017, the game sold its one millionth copy. In July 2018, a leak in Valve API revealed that over 1.68 million Steam users owned Planet Coaster. Two million copies of the games were sold by January 2019. As of January 2020, 2.5 million copies of the game had been sold.

Accolades

See also 
 Parkitect
 RollerCoaster Tycoon World
 Planet Zoo

Notes

References

External links 
 
 

2016 video games
Amusement park simulation games
Business simulation games
Early access video games
Frontier Developments games
PlayStation 4 games
PlayStation 5 games
Roller coaster games and simulations
Video games with Steam Workshop support
Video games set in amusement parks
Video games with custom soundtrack support
Video games with downloadable content
Windows games
Xbox Cloud Gaming games
Xbox One games
Xbox Series X and Series S games
Aspyr games
Single-player video games
Video games developed in the United Kingdom